The men's individual modern pentathlon event was a multi-sport combined event at the 1968 Summer Olympics. It was the 12th consecutive Games at which the event was held after being introduced in 1912. The competition involved riding, fencing, shooting, swimming, and running. The scores from the individual competition were also used for the team competition.

The event resulted in the first Olympic competitor being disqualified for doping. Hans-Gunnar Liljenwall was disqualified for alcohol use after drinking beer before the shooting phase.

Results

Hans Todt drew a stubborn horse for the riding element, which balked three times at an obstacle, resulting in Todt scoring 0 points. Todt, disconsolate at seeing his years of training gone to waste because of bad luck, attacked the horse and had to be pulled away by his teammates.

References

1968 in modern pentathlon
1968